NGC 4871 is a lenticular galaxy located about 310 million light-years away in the constellation of Coma Berenices. NGC 4871 was discovered by astronomer Heinrich d'Arrest on May 10, 1863. It is a member of the Coma Cluster.

See also 
 List of NGC objects (4001–5000)
 NGC 4874

References

External links
 

Lenticular galaxies
Coma Berenices
4871
44606
Astronomical objects discovered in 1863
Coma Cluster
Discoveries by Heinrich Louis d'Arrest